Civitanova Marche Lighthouse is an active lighthouse located
in front of the Port of Civitanova Marche, Marche on the Adriatic Sea.

History
The lighthouse is settled on the bell tower of the Church of Cristo Re; the construction of the church begun in 1933 on plan of Gustavo Stainer but was completed only in the 1980s. The bell tower was built on project of Dante Tassotti and the lighthouse was activated in 1967.

Description
The lighthouse is completely automated and operated by the Marina Militare with the identification code number 3912 E.F.

See also
 List of lighthouses in Italy
 Civitanova Marche

References

External links
 Servizio Fari Marina Militare

Lighthouses in Italy